The Nuna 6 is the 2011 model solar-powered racing car in the Nuna series built by the Dutch Nuon Solar Team. Nuna 6 has been built by students who are part of the Nuon Solar Team at the Delft University of Technology in the Netherlands. Nuna 6 weighs 145 kg, and is therefore lighter than the previous 5 cars.

In October 2011, Nuna 6 finished second in the 11th World Solar Challenge in Australia.

World Solar Challenge 2011 - New regulations

The 2011 regulations are comparable to those from 2009 (the year Nuna 5 raced).
The major change was that the solar panel of 6 m2 has to be made from silicon solar cells or has to be limited to 3 m2 for other high grade solar cells like the previously used triple junction GaAs solar cells which are mostly used in space.

Nuna 6 will use 6 m2 of monocrystalline silicon cells which will be about 22% efficient (high grade cells might be up to 35% efficient).

Technical specifications

See also
 Solar car racing
 List of solar car teams

References

External links

 Nuon Solar Team
 Photos from the Nuon solar team

Solar car racing
Delft University of Technology
Science and technology in the Netherlands
Dutch inventions

ja:Nuna#Nuna6 (2011)